WKOY-FM is an American classic rock-formatted broadcast radio station licensed to Princeton, West Virginia, serving Princeton, West Virginia, Bluefield, Virginia and Bluefield, West Virginia. WKOY-FM is owned and operated by Charles Spencer and Rick Lambert, through licensee First Media Services, LLC.

External links
WKOY Online

KOY-FM
Classic rock radio stations in the United States